Unicorns, Demos, B-Sides, and Rainbows is a 2005 album by Zolof the Rock & Roll Destroyer. It was originally released under the title: Demos, B-Sides & Whatnots and sold on Zolof's fall tour with Jet Lag Gemini and Small Towns Burn A Little Slower. This version was self-released and was on a CD-R with a sticker on the sleeve with a track listing, before Eyeball Records asked them to stop selling them which was in violation of their contract.

Track listing
 "Argh...I'm a Pirate" (demo)
 "Pinball"
 "Jersey Shore" (The Promise Ring)
 "Oh William" (Demo)
 "How 'Bout It" (Demo)
 "Java"
 "Diner Song/Wonderful Awkward" (Acoustic)
 "There's That One Person..." (Alternate Version)

Zolof the Rock & Roll Destroyer albums
2005 compilation albums